Yaroslava Burlachenko (born 14 May 1992) is a Ukrainian female handballer who plays for CS Minaur Baia Mare and the Ukrainian national team.

References 

   
 

Sportspeople from Kyiv
1992 births
Living people
Ukrainian female handball players
Expatriate handball players
Ukrainian expatriate sportspeople in Romania
Ukrainian expatriate sportspeople in Turkey